Macadai de Baixo is a village in Timor-Leste.

External links
Macadai de Baixo on Geographic.org

Populated places in East Timor